"Stop on a Dime" is a song recorded by American country music group Little Texas.  It was released in May 1994 as the fourth and final single from their second album Big Time.  It was written by the band's lead guitarist Porter Howell, keyboardist and vocalist Brady Seals, and rhythm guitarist Dwayne O'Brien. The song reached number 14 on the Billboard Hot Country Songs chart. It also peaked at number 13 on the Canadian RPM Country Tracks chart.  Before its release, it was the B-side to the band's single "What Might Have Been".

Content
The song is an uptempo that discusses the perils of falling in love.

Critical reception
Deborah Evans Price, of Billboard magazine reviewed the song favorably, calling it a "rip-roaring tune." She goes on to say that the "picking is slick and the harmonies are Texas-tight."

Chart performance
"Stop on a Dime" debuted at number 66 on the U.S. Billboard Hot Country Singles & Tracks for the week of May 21, 1994.

References

1994 singles
1993 songs
Little Texas (band) songs
Songs written by Brady Seals
Songs written by Dwayne O'Brien
Songs written by Porter Howell
Song recordings produced by James Stroud
Warner Records singles